The Runway bus is a front-side bus developed by Hewlett-Packard for use by its PA-RISC microprocessor family. The Runway bus is a 64-bit wide, split transaction, time multiplexed address and data bus running at 120 MHz. This scheme was chosen by HP as they determined that a bus using separate address and data wires would have only delivered 20% more bandwidth for a 50% increase in pin count, which would have made microprocessors using the bus more expensive. The Runway bus was introduced with the release of the PA-7200 and was subsequently used by the PA-8000, PA-8200, PA-8500, PA-8600 and PA-8700 microprocessors. Early implementations of the bus used in the PA-7200, PA-8000 and PA-8200 had a theoretical bandwidth of 960 MB/s. Beginning with the PA-8500, the Runway bus was revised to transmit on both rising and falling edges of a 125 MHz clock signal, which increased its theoretical bandwidth to 2 GB/s. The Runway bus was succeeded with the introduction of the PA-8800, which used the Itanium 2 bus.

Bus features

 64-bit multiplexed address/data
 20 bus protocol signals
 Supports cache coherency
 Three frequency options (1.0, 0.75 and 0.67 of CPU clock — 0.50 apparently was later added)
 Parity protection on address/data and control signal
 Each attached device contains its own arbitrator logic
 Split transactions, up to six transactions can be pending at once
 Snooping cache coherency protocol
 1-4 processors "glueless" multi-processing (no support chips needed)
 768 MB/s sustainable throughput, peak 960 MB/s at 120 MHz
 Runway+/Runway DDR: On PA-8500, PA-8600 and PA-8700, the bus operates in DDR (double data rate) mode, 
 resulting in a peak bandwidth of about 2.0 GB/s (Runway+ or Runway DDR) with 125 MHz

Most machines use the Runway bus to connect the CPUs directly to the IOMMU (Astro, U2/Uturn or Java) and memory.
However, the N class and L3000 servers use an interface chip called Dew to bridge the Runway bus to the Merced bus that connects to the IOMMU and memory.

References 
 
 Gwennap, Linley (November 17, 1997). "PA-8500's 1.5M Cache Aids Performance". Microprocessor Report.

Hewlett-Packard products
Computer buses